This is a list of amusement parks operating in the Central Florida area of Florida, United States.

See also
List of amusement parks in the Americas

Amusement parks in Greater Orlando
Orlando